The 2006-2007 season was FK Sarajevo's 58th season in history, and their 13th consecutive season in the top flight of Bosnian football.

Players

Squad

(Captain)

(C)

Statistics

Kit

Competitions

Premier League

League table

References

FK Sarajevo seasons
Sarajevo